This page lists the results of leadership elections held by the Parti Québécois.  From its formation in 1968 and until 2005 the party president served as party leader. Elections are by one member, one vote.

1968 leadership election

(Held on October 14, 1968)

René Lévesque acclaimed

Levesque resigned as party president on June 20, 1985. Nadia Assimopoulos becomes interim president. Levesque however is usually regarded as remaining PQ leader during this period.

1985 leadership election

(Held September 29, 1985)

Bernard Landry withdrew before voting.

Johnson resigned on November 10, 1987. Nadia Assimopoulos onces again becomes interim president and Guy Chevrette becomes interim parliamentary leader. Chevrette is usually regarded as the interim leader during this period.

1988 leadership election

(Held on March 18, 1988)

Jacques Parizeau acclaimed

1996 leadership election

(Held on January 27, 1996)

Lucien Bouchard acclaimed

2001 leadership election

(Held on March 2, 2001)

Bernard Landry acclaimed

Bernard Landry resigned on June 6, 2005. Louise Harel was chosen interim parliamentary leader.

2005 leadership election

(Held on November 15, 2005)

Eligible voters: 137,238
Turnout: 76.69%
*: Gilbert Paquette withdrew and asked his supporters to vote for Pauline Marois on November 10, 2005.

Boisclair resigned on May 8, 2007. François Gendron was chosen interim leader.

2007 leadership election

(Held on June 27, 2007)

Pauline Marois acclaimed

Gilles Duceppe was a candidate but withdrew after 24 hours.

2015 leadership election

(Held May 13–15, 2015)

Pierre Karl Péladeau 57.58%
Alexandre Cloutier 29.21%
Martine Ouellet 13.21%
Eligible voters: 71,020
Turnout 79.9%

2016 leadership election

(Held October 7, 2016)

First round:
Jean-François Lisée: 25,936 (47.03%)
Alexandre Cloutier: 16,357 (29.66%)
Martine Ouellet: 9,077 (16.46%)
Paul St-Pierre Plamondon: 3,772 (6.84%)

Second round:

Jean-François Lisée: 27,801 (50.63%)
Alexandre Cloutier: 17,403  (31.70%)
Martine Ouellet: 9,702 (17.67%)
Total votes: 55,142
Turnout: 75.09 per cent

2020 leadership election 

(Held October 9, 2020)

References

http://www.assnat.qc.ca/en/patrimoine/chronologie/index.html

See also
leadership convention
Parti Québécois